Francesco Paglia (1636 – c. 1714) was an Italian painter of the late-Baroque period, mainly active in Brescia.

Biography
He was a pupil of Guercino. He also wrote a description of paintings in Brescia, using both prose and poetry, titled il Giardino della Pittura (The Garden of Painting). A copy of the manuscript was in the hands of the Avogadro family, which was known for their local patronage. Paglia also painted a St. Onofrio in the desert for the church of San Barnaba.

He had two sons, Antonio (1680- 9 February 1747) and Angelo (born 1681), both painters. Antonio moved to Venice after the death of his father to study with Sebastiano Ricci. Angelo also learned to sculpt in clay from the Brescian Santo Calegari.

References

External links

1636 births
17th-century Italian painters
Italian male painters
Italian art historians
Painters from Brescia
Italian Baroque painters
Year of death unknown